Heaths Creek is a stream in Cooper, Pettis and
Saline counties in the U.S. state of Missouri. It is a tributary of the Lamine River.

Heaths Creek was named after John G. Heath, a pioneer citizen.

See also
List of rivers of Missouri

References

Rivers of Cooper County, Missouri
Rivers of Pettis County, Missouri
Rivers of Saline County, Missouri
Rivers of Missouri